The slender litter skink (Sphenomorphus forbesi)  is a species of skink found in Papua New Guinea.

References

forbesi
Reptiles described in 1888
Taxa named by George Albert Boulenger
Skinks of New Guinea